Lotilia is a small genus of gobies native to the Indo-Pacific region.  The members of this genus are commensal with shrimps of the genus Alpheus.

Species
There are two recognized species in this genus:
 Lotilia graciliosa Klausewitz, 1960 (Whitecap goby)
 Lotilia klausewitzi Shibukawa, T. Suzuki & Senou, 2012

References

Gobiidae
Taxa named by Wolfgang Klausewitz